Ivan Zammit (born 17 March 1972 in Valletta, Malta) is a former professional footballer, currently the head coach at Maltese First Division side Gżira United.

International career
Ivan played international football for his home nation Malta. Zammit gained his first cap in a home match against Albania on 16 August 1995. During Zammit's international career from 1995 to 1999, he made 21 appearances, but failed to score any goals.

External links
 

Living people
1972 births
Maltese footballers
Valletta F.C. players
Żurrieq F.C. players
Floriana F.C. players
Ħamrun Spartans F.C. players
Birkirkara F.C. players
Marsaxlokk F.C. players
Vittoriosa Stars F.C. players
Balzan F.C. players
Maltese football managers
People from Valletta
Association football defenders
Malta under-21 international footballers
Malta international footballers